Kill Your Boyfriend is the title of a comic book one-shot written by Grant Morrison and drawn by Philip Bond and D'Israeli for DC Comics Vertigo imprint in June 1995.

Publication history
Originally published as part of the Vertigo Voices series of one-shots in 1995, Kill Your Boyfriend was reprinted in the prestige format in 1998 with an afterword from Morrison and a paper fortune teller. A third edition was published in October 2008.

Synopsis
The story is a darkly comic satire of British youth culture which revolves round a bookish middle class schoolgirl, who has a bland unexciting life until she meets a strange young boy who convinces her to kill her boyfriend. They then go on the run together for a series of anarchic adventures across Britain.

Meeting up with a group of travellers in a double-decker bus, the pair indulge in more crime and sexual experimentation before making their way to Blackpool to meet their final fate.

Writing
Morrison notes in the afterword of the second edition that the story is inspired in part by the myth of Dionysus.

Reception
In 2013, ComicsAlliance ranked Boy as #10 on their list of the "50 Sexiest Male Characters in Comics". 
One critic draws parallels with such films as Natural Born Killers.

Notes

References

External links
 Before All Star - Grant Morrison on Kill Your Boyfriend, Newsarama, November 6, 2008

Reviews
 Review of Kill Your Boyfriend by Matt Fraction, Art Bomb
 Review of Kill Your Boyfriend at KvltSite

1995 comics debuts
Black comedy books
Comics by Grant Morrison
Punk comics